Metacycline or methacycline is a tetracycline antibiotic. It is used as a precursor in the industrial synthesis of doxycycline hyclate.

It has been found to act as an agonist of the human pregnane X receptor ligand-binding domain and to induce CYP3A4 expression in vitro.

References

Tetracycline antibiotics
Triketones